Majharia is a village in the West Champaran district of the Indian state of Bihar.

Demographics
As of 2011 India census, Majharia had a population of 1942 in 391 households. Males constituted 52.26% of the population and females 47.73%. It had an average literacy rate of 39.49%, lower than the national average of 74%; male literacy was 64.14% and female literacy was 35.85%. 22.5% of the population was under 6 years of age.

References

Villages in West Champaran district